Ancylus is a genus of very small, freshwater, air-breathing limpets. They are aquatic pulmonate gastropod mollusks in the tribe Ancylini within the family Planorbidae, the ram's horn snails and their allies.

The genus is known throughout the Cenozoic.

Species
Species in the genus Ancylus include:
 Ancylus aduncus A. A. Gould, 1847
 † Ancylus alutae Jekelius, 1932 
 Ancylus ashangiensis Brown, 1965
 Ancylus benoitianus Bourguignat, 1862
 † Ancylus bourgeoisi Deshayes, 1863 
 † Ancylus boyeri Noulet, 1867 
 † Ancylus braunii Dunker, 1853 
 Ancylus capuloides Jan in Porro, 1838
 † Ancylus cestasensis Peyrot, 1932 
 † Ancylus depressus Deshayes, 1824 
 † Ancylus dumasi Fontannes, 1884 
 † Ancylus elegans J. de C. Sowerby, 1826 
 Ancylus expansilabris Clessin, 1881
 Ancylus fluviatilis Müller, 1774 -  the type species
 † Ancylus hungaricus Brusina, 1902 
 Ancylus lapicidus Hubendick, 1960
 † Ancylus lyelli Maillard, 1892 
 † Ancylus moravicus Rzehak, 1893 
 † Ancylus ninghaiensis Youluo, 1978 
 † Ancylus parmophorus de Stefani, 1880 
 Ancylus pileolus
 Ancylus recurvus Martens, 1873
 Ancylus regularis Brown, 1973
 Ancylus rupicola Boubée, 1832
 † Ancylus saucatsensis Peyrot, 1932 (?) 
 Ancylus scalariformis Stankovic & Radoman, 1953
  † Ancylus serbicus Brusina, 1893
 Ancylus striatus Quoy & Gaimard, 1834
 Ancylus subcircularis Clessin, 1880
 † Ancylus subcostatus Benoist, 1873
 Ancylus tapirulus Polinski, 1929

Synonyms
 † Ancylus croaticus Brusina, 1902: synonym of † Acroloxus croaticus (Brusina, 1902) 
 † Ancylus decussatus Reuss in Reuss & Meyer, 1849: synonym of  †Acroloxus decussatus (Reuss in Reuss & Meyer, 1849) 
 † Ancylus deperditolacustris Gottschick, 1911: synonym of † Acroloxus deperditolacustris (Gottschick, 1911) 
 † Ancylus deperditus (Desmarest, 1814): synonym of † Ferrissia deperdita (Desmarest, 1814) 
 Ancylus drouetianus Bourguignat, 1862: synonym of Williamia gussoni (Costa O. G., 1829)
 Ancylus fuscus C. B. Adams, 1840: synonym of Laevapex fuscus (C. B. Adams, 1840)
 Ancylus gibbosus Bourguignat, 1862: synonym of Williamia gussoni (Costa O. G., 1829)
 Ancylus gussonii O. G. Costa, 1829: synonym of  Williamia gussonii (O. G. Costa, 1829)
 † Ancylus illyricus Neumayr, 1880: synonym of  †Ferrissia illyrica (Neumayr, 1880) 
 † Ancylus involutus Pavlović, 1903: synonym of † Acroloxus involutus (Pavlović, 1903) 
 † Ancylus michaudi Locard, 1878: synonym of † Acroloxus michaudi (Locard, 1878) 
 † Ancylus neumayri Fontannes, 1881: synonym of  †Ferrissia neumayri (Fontannes, 1881) 
 Ancylus patelloides I. Lea, 1856: synonym of Lanx patelloides (I. Lea, 1856)
 † Ancylus pontileviensis Morgan, 1920: synonym of † Ferrissia pontileviensis (Morgan, 1920) 
 † Ancylus wittmanni Schlickum, 1964: synonym of † Ferrissia wittmanni (Schlickum, 1964)

Cladogram 
A cladogram based on sequences of mitochondrial 16S ribosomal RNA and cytochrome-c oxidase I (COI) genes showing phylogenic relations of Ancylus by Albrecht et al. (2006):

References

Further reading
 2000. Ancylidae (On-line), Animal Diversity Web. http://animaldiversity.ummz.umich.edu/site/accounts/information/Ancylidae.html

Planorbidae